The Groom is a 2016 Russian comedy film, directorial debut of Alexander Nezlobin.

Plot
A German named Helmut (Philippe Reinhardt), having fallen in love with a Russian girl named Alena (Svetlana Smirnova-Martsinkevich), whom he met in Berlin, arrives in Russia on Victory Day (9 May) to ask for her hand in marriage. Having welcomed the groom, Alena goes to the village to introduce him to her relatives. But at this time Tolya (Sergei Svetlakov) - her ex-husband, is visiting the village, who suddenly decided to get his wife back.

Serious rivalry awakes when the ex-husband is introduced to the new groom. All friends, relatives, residents of the neighboring village, businessman Erofeev (Sergey Burunov), who bought the house next door, and even a tankman with a snake - all are involved in the family affair.

Cast
Sergei Svetlakov - Tolya
Olga Kartunkova - Lyuba
Sergey Burunov - Erofeev
George Dronov - Lyapichev
Alexander Demidov - Pokuchaev
Philippe Reinhardt - Helmut
Svetlana Smirnova-Martsinkevich - Alena
Dmitry Nikulin - Lyoshka
Natalia Parshenkova - Balasha
Magomed Murtazaliev - Maga
Mahmoud Huseynov - Maga's brother
Timothy Zaitsev - tanker
Yan Tsapnik - policeman
Roman Madyanov - General
Grigory Bagrov - border guard
Lisa Izmaylova is a girl
Albina Evtushevskaya - grandmother No. 1
Violetta Beketova - grandmother № 2

Sequel
A sequel has been announced, titled The Groom 2: To Berlin!.

References

External links

Russian romantic comedy films
2016 romantic comedy films
2016 directorial debut films